The men's 50 metre butterfly event at the 11th FINA World Swimming Championships (25m) took place 14 – 15 December 2012 at the Sinan Erdem Dome.

Records
Prior to this competition, the existing world and championship records were as follows.

The following records were established during the competition:

Results

Heats

Semifinals

Final

The final was held at 19:52.

References

External links
 2012 FINA World Swimming Championships (25 m): Men's 50 metre butterfly entry list, from OmegaTiming.com.

Butterfly 050 metre, men's
World Short Course Swimming Championships